Lanvi Organisation is a political party in Haiti, led by Yves Cristilan. In the 2010–11 general elections, the party won 7 seats.

References

Political parties in Haiti
Political parties with year of establishment missing